Hot Singers is a South Korean television program that follows the journey of a group of celebrities, coming together to form a choir. The show aired on JTBC every Monday at 9:00 (KST) from March 14 to May 30, 2022.

Overview

Hot Singers depicts a choir challenge among veteran actors in the entertainment industry whose careers add up to some 500 years, to sing in harmony and share their life stories.

Musical director Kim Moon-jeong and singer-songwriter Choi Jung-hoon joined forces to train and lead the choir.

Cast
Choir member 

 Kim Young-ok
 Na Moon-hee
 Kim Kwang-kyu
 Jang Hyun-sung
 Lee Jong-hyuk
 Choi Dae-chul
 Lee Byung-joon
 Woo Hyun
 Lee Seo-hwan
 Yoon Yoo-sun
 Woo Mi-hwa
 Kwon In-ha
 Seo Yi-sook
 Park Jun-myeon
 Jun Hyun-moo
 Jung Young-joo

Music director 
 Kim Moon-jeong
 Choi Jung-hoon

Guest 
 Lee Seok-hoon (Ep. 4)  
 La Poem (Ep. 6)

Original soundtrack

Ratings

References

External links
  
 Hot Singers at Naver 

South Korean music television shows
South Korean variety television shows
Korean-language television shows
2022 South Korean television series debuts
JTBC original programming
2022 South Korean television series endings